Addy Lee Eng-tat  (born 2 May 1971) is a celebrities' hair stylist, known for unique styling with hairstyle. He left home in 1984, at the age of 13 to pursue a childhood dream.

Biography
Lee was the youngest son of a grocery shop owner. In his young mind, he had just wished to work in an air-conditioned workplace where he didn't have to sweat and with nice clothes to wear.

In 1990, at the age of 19, he left his hometown in Penang, Malaysia and went to Singapore. For three years, he moved from one hair salon to another, gaining work experience in both the creative art of hairdressing and the competencies of running a hair salon business. Lee is, today a famed name in Singapore.

He has worked on his portfolio on from TV, print commercials, hairshows, seminars workshops and local artistes like Michelle Chia, Joanne Peh, Quan Yi Fong, Mark Lee, Bryan Wong and more.

Lee has opened salons in Singapore and Malaysia, and the Monsoon Hair Academy in January 2007 to coach trainees who wish to establish a career in the hairdressing and hairstyling.

Besides working as a hair stylist, Lee also did live-stream sales in China.

In September 2021, Lee started a live-stream company, Mdada, with business partners and friends Pornsak Prajakwit and Michelle Chia to sell products on Facebook Live.

Personal life
Lee is the godfather of Eleanor Lee, daughter of Quan Yi Fong, who took on his surname.

References

Hairdressers
1971 births
Living people
People from Penang
Singaporean television personalities
Malaysian people of Chinese descent
Malaysian emigrants to Singapore